International Star is a retired American Thoroughbred racehorse. He accumulated 171 points for the 2015 Road to the Kentucky Derby which is the most points ever for non-extended series events accumulated in the series. He had wins in the Grey Stakes (10 points), Lecomte Stakes (10 points), Risen Star Stakes (50 points), and Louisiana Derby (100 points). He also had a fourth place finish in the Kentucky Jockey Club Stakes (1 point). Despite this, he was scratched from the Kentucky Derby.

Background

International Star was bred in New York by Katharine Voss and Robert Manfuso.  Ken and Sarah Ramsey purchased him as a yearling for $85,000 at the 2013 Fasig-Tipton Midlantic Eastern Fall Yearling Sale. By his fourth start he became a graded stakes winner by finishing first in the Grey Stakes. At age three he went on to win consecutive races in the Lecomte Stakes, Risen Star Stakes, and Louisiana Derby. However, on the day of the Kentucky Derby, a chip was discovered in his left front ankle that would require surgery. The horse was scratched from the race due to this development. He returned to racing, winning the Louisiana Stakes and finishing second in the New Orleans Handicap and Mineshaft Handicap. He retired with a 6-4-1 record out of 19 starts and earned $1,247,529. He was sold to Haras Porta Pia Stud Farm near Santiago, Chile, entering stud in 2020.

Pedigree

 indicates inbreeding 4s x 4d to Halo, meaning Halo appears in the fourth generation of the sire's side of the pedigree and in the fourth generation of the dam's side.

References

2012 racehorse births
Racehorses bred in New York (state)
Racehorses trained in the United States
Thoroughbred family 4-g